South Khorasan Province ( Ostān-e Khorāsān-e Jonūbī) is one of the 31 provinces of Iran, located in the eastern part of the country. Birjand is the centre  and capital of the province. At the time of the National Census of 2006, the province had a population of 600,568 in 159,255 households. The following census in 2011 counted 662,534 people in 183,114 households. In 2014, it was placed in Region 5. At the most recent census in 2016, the population of South Khorasan province was 768,898 in 223,984 households.

This new province, is but the old Quhistan which was included into greater Khorasan in the Iranian administrative planning. However, historically Qohistan forms a separate entity, with a distinct culture, history, environment and ecology.

South Khorasan is one of the three provinces that were created after the division of Khorasan in 2004. While at the beginning, the newly created "South Khorasan" included only Birjand County and some new counties detached from that county (i.e. Nehbandan, Darmian and Sarbisheh), in subsequent years, all northern and western cities and territories of the old Quhistan (such as Qaen, Ferdows and Tabas) have been annexed into South Khorasan, which as of 2016 consists of 11 counties.

History 

Greater Khorasan has witnessed the rise and fall of many dynasties and governments in its territory throughout history. Various tribes of the Arabs, Turks, Kurds, Mongols, Turkemen and Afghans brought changes to the region time and time again.

Ancient geographers of Iran divided Iran ("Iran-Shahr") into eight segments of which the most flourishing and largest was the territory of Greater Khorasan. Esfarayen, among other cities of the province, was one of the focal points for the residence of the Aryan tribes after entering Iran.

The Parthian empire was based near Merv in Khorasan for many years. At Parthians times, Esfarayen was one of the important villages of Nishapur.

During the Sassanid dynasty the province was governed by a Spahbod (Lieutenant General) called "Padgoosban" and four margraves, each commander of one of the four parts of the province.

Khorasan was divided into four parts during the Muslim conquest of Persia, each section being named after the four largest cities, Nishapur, Merv, Herat, and Balkh.

In the year 651, the army of Islamic Arabs invaded Khorasan. The territory remained in the hands of the Abbasid clan until 820, followed by the rule of the Iranian Taherid clan in the year 896 and the Samanid dynasty in 900.

Mahmud of Ghazni conquered Khorasan in 994 and in the year 1037 Toghrül, the first of the Seljuq empire rulers conquered Nishapur.

Mahmud of Ghazni retaliated against the invaders several times, and finally the Ghaznavids defeated Sultan Sanjar. But there was more to come, as in 1157 Khorasan was conquered by the Khwarazmids and because of simultaneous attacks by the Mongols, Khorasan was annexed to the territories of the Mongol Ilkhanate.

In the 14th century, a flag of independence was hoisted by the Sarbedaran movement in Sabzevar, and in 1468, Khorasan came into the hands of Tamerlane and the city of Herat was declared as the capital.

In 1507, Khorasan was occupied by Uzbek tribes. After the death of Nader Shah in 1747, parts of it were occupied by the Afghans for a short period.

In these periods, Birjand was a small part of Quhistan which almost encompasses the borders of today South Khorasan. The main cities of Quhistan were Toon (now Ferdows) and Qaen. Birjand grew in recent centuries, especially during the Qajar dynasty and found its important role in this region.

This region was a place of refuge for some movements like the Ismaili, and was the target of Arab refugees who escaped from the tyranny of the Abbasid caliphate. Zoroastrian vestiges also exist in the area.

In 1824, Herat became independent for several years when the Afghan Empire was split between the Durranis and Barakzais. The Persians sieged the city in 1837, but the British assisted the Afghans in repelling them. In 1856, the Persians launched another invasion, and briefly managed to recapture the city; it led directly to the Anglo-Persian War. In 1857 hostilities between the Persians and the British ended after the Treaty of Paris was signed, and the Persian troops withdrew from Herat. Afghanistan reconquered Herat in 1863 under Dost Muhammad Khan, two weeks before his death.

Khorasan was the largest province of Iran until it was divided into three provinces on September 29, 2004. The provinces approved by the parliament of Iran (on May 18, 2004) and the Council of Guardians (on May 29, 2004) were Razavi Khorasan, North Khorasan, and South Khorasan.

Administrative divisions

Cities 

According to the 2016 census, 448,147 people (over 58% of the population of South Khorasan province) live in the following cities: Arianshahr 3,729, Asadiyeh 5,460, Ayask 5,143, Birjand 203,636, Boshruyeh 16,426, Deyhuk 2,959, Eresk 2,955, Esfeden 3,598, Eshqabad 3,965, Eslamiyeh 7,108, Ferdows 28,695, Gazik 2,294, Hajjiabad 6,168, Khusf 5,716, Mohammadshahr 3,590, Mud 3,477, Nehbandan 18,304, Nimbeluk 4,762, Qaen 42,323, Qohestan 2,322, Sarayan 13,795, Sarbisheh 8,715, Seh Qaleh 4,436, Shusef 3,181, Tabas 39,676, Tabas-e Masina 4,596, and Zohan 1,118.

Most populous cities 
The following sorted table lists the most populous cities in South Khorasan province.

South Khorasan today 

The major ethnic groups in this region are the Persians, as well as sizeable ethnic Baloch and Pashtun populations. South Khorasan is known for its famous rugs as well as its saffron, barberry which is produced in almost all parts of the province.

Historic and natural attractions 
South Khorasan has many historic and natural attractions, but besides these, South Khorasan encompasses various religious buildings and places of pilgrimage as well.

The Cultural Heritage of Iran lists 1179 sites of historical and cultural significance in all three provinces of Khorasan.

Some of the popular attractions of South Khorasan are:

Birjand castle
Deragon Cave
Furg Citadel
Ferdows Religious School
Ferdows Hole-in-the-Rock
Ferdows Hot Spring
Ghal'eh Paeen-Shahr
Jameh Mosque of Ferdows
Kurit Dam
Kushk Complex
Qanats of Baladeh Ferdows
Nehbandan Citadel
Polond Desert

Higher Education 

University of Birjand
Birjand University of Medical Sciences
 Islamic Azad University of Birjand
Islamic Azad University of Ferdows
Birjand University of Technology
Payame Noor University
University of Applied Science and Technology (south khorasan branch)
Academy of Tarbiat-e Moalem
Academy of Amuzesh-e Aly
Academy of Amuzesh-e Modiriat Dolaty

Gallery

See also 

 Khorasan
 Razavi Khorasan
 North Khorasan

References

External links 
 The text of the law for division of Khorasan into three provinces (in Persian)
 Cultural Heritage Foundation of Khorasan

 
Provinces of Iran